Levi Coleman (born December 14, 1986 in Tulsa, Oklahoma) is an American soccer player who currently is the head coach of Tulsa Athletic and an assistant at Oral Roberts University.

Career

Youth and college
Coleman attended Broken Arrow High School in Broken Arrow, Oklahoma and played two years of college soccer at the Florida International University, before transferring to the University of Missouri-Kansas City prior to his junior year. At FIU he was named to the Conference USA all-Freshman team, while at UMKC he was a second team all-Summit League selection, and was named to the all-Newcomer team in 2008.

During his college years Coleman also played for the Palm Beach Pumas and Kansas City Brass in the USL Premier Development League.

Professional
Coleman signed his first professional contract with the Charleston Battery in April 2010 after being spotted at the 2010 USL PDL Showcase, and giving a strong performance in the pre-season Carolina Challenge Cup.

He made his professional debut, and scored his first professional goal, on April 17, 2010 in a 3-2 win over the Charlotte Eagles. On October 7, 2013, Coleman signed with the Tulsa Revolution of the Professional Arena Soccer League.

Honors

Player
Charleston Battery
USL Second Division Champions (1): 2010
USL Second Division Regular Season Champions (1): 2010

Tulsa Athletic
NPSL South Central Division Playoffs Champions (2): 2013, 2014
NPSL South Central Division Regular Season Champions 2016

Manager
Tulsa Athletic
UPSL Central Conference-North Division Regular Season Champions (1): Fall 2020
NPSL South Heartland Division Playoff Champions (1): 2021
NPSL South Heartland Division Regular Season Shield (1): 2022
NPSL South Conference Playoff Champions (1): 2021
NPSL National Playoff Runner-up: 2021
NPSL Coach of the Season 2021

References

External links
 Charleston Battery bio
 UMKC bio
 FIU bio

1986 births
Living people
American soccer players
Soccer players from Oklahoma
Charleston Battery players
Kansas City Brass players
Palm Beach Pumas players
Tulsa Revolution players
USL League Two players
National Premier Soccer League players
USL Second Division players
FIU Panthers men's soccer players
Association football forwards
USL Championship players
Kansas City Roos men's soccer players